Eupithecia vetula is a moth in the family Geometridae. It is found in Afghanistan, Pakistan and India.

References

Moths described in 2008
vetula
Moths of Asia